South Broward High School (SBHS) is a marine science magnet school located in the Royal Poinciana neighborhood of Hollywood, Florida, United States. The school is a part of the Broward County Public Schools district.

South Broward High had an FCAT school grade of "B" for the 2009–2010 academic year.

Overview 
The site for the school was located approximately two miles north in the city of Dania at the current site of Dania Beach Elementary School. It is the second oldest high school established in Broward County, after Fort Lauderdale High School.  Dania High School, which had been a part of the Dania School founded in 1913 by the Dade County School Board, was renamed South Broward in 1938.  Its name was appropriate considering that when Broward County was founded in 1915, it was effectively the only public school serving the southern half of the county.  When a larger school was needed, the campus relocated to its present site at the corner of Federal Highway and Harding Street in 1949, and expanded northward not long after.  After South Broward was integrated in 1966, it absorbed a significant number of the African American student body that had attended Attucks School (now the site of Attucks Middle School), which had served grades 7 through 12.

The school's athletic teams are known as the Bulldogs. The school offers a wide range of extracurricular and athletic activities.

It is one of the more ethnically and socioeconomically diverse high schools in Florida, providing an accurate demographic sample of the city of Hollywood as a whole.

Demographics
As of the 2021-22 school year, the total student enrollment was 2,308. The ethnic makeup of the school was 62.3% White, 30.8% Black, 42.5% Hispanic, 2.1% Asian, 4.1% Multiracial, 0.5% Native American or Native Alaskan, and 0.1% Native Hawaiian or Pacific Islander.

Notable alumni 
 Marquise Brown - WR, Baltimore Ravens of the NFL
 Chris Bushing - former professional baseball player with the Cincinnati Reds
 Travis Daniels - cornerback for the Cleveland Browns of the NFL
 Warren Day - former actor
 Janice Dickinson - first supermodel, TV celebrity
 Gary Farmer (Florida politician) - A member of the Florida Senate since 2016
 Howard Finkelstein - chief public defender of Broward County
 Tucker Frederickson - former running back for the New York Giants of the NFL
 Bill Hawkins - former defensive lineman for the Los Angeles Rams of the NFL
 Josh James (baseball) - professional baseball player with the Houston Astros
 Tamara James - former WNBA player with the (Washington Mystics), Mayor of the City of Dania Beach
 Bobby Kent - murder victim;  inspiration for the film Bully
 Danny McManus - former Florida State University professional American and Canadian football
 Rosie Ruiz - declared winner of the 84th Boston Marathon; later stripped of medal.
 Toccara Williams - former WNBA player with the San Antonio Silver Stars.

References

External links 
 South Broward High School
 School profile
 South Broward High School Band
 South Broward classes of '70, '71, and '72 Facebook page

Broward County Public Schools
High schools in Broward County, Florida
Public high schools in Florida
Magnet schools in Florida
Buildings and structures in Hollywood, Florida
1938 establishments in Florida
Educational institutions established in 1938